is a passenger railway station in the town of Nakanojō, Gunma Prefecture, Japan, operated by East Japan Railway Company (JR East).

Lines
Ichishiro Station is a station on the Agatsuma Line, and is located 16.4 rail kilometers from the terminus of the line at Shibukawa Station.

Station layout
The station consists of a single side platform with a modified freight container used as the station building. The station is unattended.

History
Ichishiro Station was opened on 20 November 1945. The station was absorbed into the JR East network upon the privatization of the Japanese National Railways (JNR) on 1 April 1987.

Surrounding area
 Azuma Onsen

See also
 List of railway stations in Japan

External links

 JR East Station information 

Railway stations in Gunma Prefecture
Agatsuma Line
Stations of East Japan Railway Company 
Railway stations in Japan opened in 1945
Nakanojō, Gunma